The following is a list of United States ambassadors, or other chiefs of mission, to El Salvador. The title given by the United States State Department to this position is currently Ambassador Extraordinary and Minister Plenipotentiary.

Chiefs of mission

See also
El Salvador – United States relations
Foreign relations of El Salvador
Ambassadors of the United States

References

 
United States Department of State: Background notes on El Salvador

External links
 United States Department of State: Chiefs of Mission for El Salvador
 United States Department of State: El Salvador
 United States Embassy in San Salvador

El Salvador
Main
United States